E24 Näringsliv was a Swedish online business newspaper based in Stockholm, Sweden. It was previously named Näringsliv24 (N24, Business24), but changed to E24 in 2006. It started as N24 on 4 October 2005, and was owned by Svenska Dagbladet (60%) and Aftonbladet (40%). One of the editors-in-chief was Per Lundsjö.

E24 Näringsliv exchanged material with SvD.se and Aftonbladet.se, and had a job recruitment site, Jobb24.se.

In 2006 a Norwegian version of the newspaper, E24 Næringsliv, was launched. E24.no was owned by Aftenposten (60%) and Verdens Gang (40%). Like the owners of E24.se, both Aftenposten and Verdens Gang are owned by the Norwegian media company Schibsted.

In 2012 E24 Näringsliv was replaced by Nliv.se.

References

External links
 Official site

2005 establishments in Sweden
2012 establishments in Sweden
Business newspapers
Defunct newspapers published in Sweden
Newspapers established in 2005
Newspapers published in Stockholm
Publications disestablished in 2012
Swedish-language newspapers